The South African Railways Class GEA 4-8-2+2-8-4 of 1946 was an articulated steam locomotive.

During 1946 and 1947, the South African Railways placed fifty Class GEA Garratt articulated steam locomotives with a 4-8-2+2-8-4 Double Mountain type wheel arrangement in service.

Manufacturer
The Class GEA 4-8-2+2-8-4 Double Mountain type Garratt locomotive was the first new post-Second World War locomotive class to be introduced on the South African Railways (SAR). It was designed by Dr. M.M. Loubser, Chief Mechanical Engineer (CME) of the SAR from 1939 to 1949, and although it was a development of the Class GE 2-8-2+2-8-2 locomotive, it bore little resemblance to the older locomotive.

It had a boiler which was designed to be inter­change­able with that of the earlier Garratt model regarding external dimensions, but it had a bar frame and a round-topped firebox instead of the plate frame and Belpaire firebox of the earlier locomotive. The Class GEA was the first South African Garratt to have streamlined water tanks and coal bunkers and its engine units were radically different from those of the Class GE, with an expanded wheel arrangement in the form of a leading four-wheeled bogie instead of a two-wheeled Bissel truck.

An order for fifty locomotives was placed with Beyer, Peacock and Company in 1945, the largest single Garratt order ever placed with them. When they were delivered during 1946 and 1947, they were erected at the Uitenhage shops and numbered in the range from 4001 to 4050.

Characteristics
The locomotives were superheated and had Walschaerts valve gear. They were the only post-war Garratts on the SAR to be without mechanical stokers and also one of the largest designs of Garratt to be manually stoked.

Its round-topped firebox was fitted with eight flexible cross-stays at the front end. The inner firebox was of steel instead of copper and it had a hopper type ashpan, fitted with an efficient arrangement of drench pipes. The ashpan doors were steam-operated with provision for hand operation when required. The finger bar fire grate was operated by two steam shaker cylinders and had two drop grates. The boiler pressure was  higher than that of the Class GE and it had a larger superheater area with 36 elements and incorporating a multiple valve regulator. The locomotive had a self-cleaning smokebox and was fitted with a spark arrester.

The pivots were of the adjustable type and were oil lubricated. The wheel arrangement was extended from a  Double Mikado to a  Double Mountain configuration, which permitted increased coal and water capacities. It had  larger diameter coupled wheels, all flanged. The locomotive was designed to negotiate a minimum curve of  radius, with  superelevation and gauge widening not exceeding .

The outer pairs of bogie wheels were arranged with tyre flange watering gear. The bogies and bissels both had Timken roller bearing axle boxes. The front engine unit had two  diameter vacuum brake cylinders, while the hind engine units were provided with steam and hand brakes.

The cab arrangement was made especially convenient for the crew. The double roof was lined with teak while side louvre ventilators with roller slides were fitted. The cab front and sides had ventilating doors. Sliding louvres in the cab sides provided adequate weather protection while the lookout had hinged adjustable glass windscreens. The cab was completely enclosed with sliding side doors and the crew had upholstered hinged seats with armrests.

At least one locomotive was named. No. 4023 bore the name Peacock on a plate mounted above its cabside number plates.

Modifications
Soon after they entered service, the front tanks of some of the locomotives were modified.

Two locomotives, numbers 4036 and 4049, were modified in 1952 by having their coal capacity increased by means of extensions to the upper sides of their coal bunkers. Photographs show that more locomotives were later similarly modified. It does not appear as if these locomotives were ever officially reclassified to identify them as mainline locomotives, although they are referred to as Class GEAM in an annotation in the South African Railways and Harbours Locomotive Diagram Book. The post-modification coal capacity is not specified in the documentation.

In the Western Cape, wheatland fires caused by locomotives were a huge problem for farmers as well as for the SAR who had to pay out the claims. In the late 1960s Johannes Barnard, the assistant locomotive superintendent at Cape Town, used two locomotives to experiment with spark-extinguishing equipment, a Class GEA and a Class 19C. The spark extinguishers were mounted on the chimneys and consisted of two long tubes to extend the exhaust horizontally. The tubes had spray pipes around the vertical outlet at the end to drench any sparks that may have survived the journey along the tubes. In the case of Class GEA no. 4009 the tubes fed the exhaust forward to the outlet above the front end of the Garratt’s water bunker, which led to the engine being nicknamed Renoster (rhinoceros). The experiments were not successful.

Service

South African Railways
The locomotives were designed for goods traffic on light  rail on branch lines. Some teething troubles were experienced when they were first placed in service, but these were solved and they proved themselves as fine performers. They started their service lives working goods traffic on the lines from Johannesburg to Zeerust in the Western Transvaal.

In the Cape Province, they worked from Voorbaai to Oudtshoorn across the Montagu Pass and in the opposite direction to Riversdale. Some were later transferred to Natal to work on the North Coast line, based at Stanger and Empangeni, and on the Eshowe and Nkwalini branches. They also worked on the Franklin branch and the Overberg line from Cape Town across Sir Lowry's Pass to Caledon. The Class GEA was withdrawn from service by 1976.

Royal visit, 1947

During 1947, King George VI, accompanied by Queen Elizabeth and the Princesses Elizabeth and Margaret, visited the British territories in Southern Africa. The Royal Visit began in South Africa in February. Transport during the Royal Visit was aboard the Royal Train of the SAR, most of which later became the White Train for use by the Governor General of South Africa during the remaining years of the Union era and until the mid-1970s by the State President in the Republican era. During the Royal Visit, only selected British-built locomotives were used as motive power for the Royal Train. One of these was Class GEA no. 4024.

Industrial
Six Class GEA locomotives were sold into industrial service.
 No. 4003 went to Dunns Locomotive Works in the Witbank area.
 No. 4020 went to Dunns Locomotive Works and was initially used at Enyati Colliery and later at Vryheid Coronation Colliery.
 No. 4023 went to Vryheid Coronation Colliery as no. 6.
 No. 4024 went to Dunns Locomotive Works, for hire in the Witbank area.
 No. 4027 went to Dunns Locomotive Works for use at Enyati Colliery.
 No. 4031 went to Vryheid Coronation Colliery as no. 5.

Preservation

Of the Class Gea, several survived into preservation. By 2018

Illustration

References

2420
2420
4-8-2+2-8-4 locomotives
2D1+1D2 locomotives
Beyer, Peacock locomotives
Garratt locomotives
Cape gauge railway locomotives
Railway locomotives introduced in 1946
1946 in South Africa